Failetown is a ghost town in Clarke County, Alabama, United States.

Geography
Failetown was located at 31°55'42.46" North, 88°00'58.16" West (31.928432, -88.016161).

History
Lewis Faile and his children, Richmond, Terrell and Morgan Faile settled Failetown in the 1850s when they moved west from South Carolina. Today the town sits abandoned. The Faile Cemetery, Post Office, and other homes in various states of decay are all that remain of the town today.

On October 4, 1813 the Bashi Skirmish of the Creek War was fought in Failetown.
A Clarke County historical marker which stands on Woods Bluff Road between Alabama 69 and Cassidy Hill marks the location.

References

Geography of Clarke County, Alabama
Ghost towns in Alabama